Jack Gilbert (1925–2012) was an American poet.

Jack Gilbert may also refer to:

Jack Gilbert (baseball) (1875–1941), American baseball player
Jack Gilbert (footballer) (1875–1973), Australian rules footballer
Jack Gilbert (rugby league), Australian rugby league footballer

See also
Jack Gilbert Graham (1932–1957), mass-murderer
John Gilbert (disambiguation)